William Norman McCourt Uprichard (20 April 1928 – 31 January 2011) was a football player for Arsenal, Portsmouth, Swindon Town and Northern Ireland.

Gaelic football career

Uprichard was born in Lurgan, Northern Ireland, and as a teenager played both soccer and Gaelic football. He won a district minor league medal with St. Peter's GAC, but was subsequently banned by the GAA and told he would not receive his medal because he had signed for Glenavon. The GAA's 'rule 27' prohibited adult members at the time from playing or watching so-called foreign games. Uprichard was finally awarded his medal in 2004.

Association football career

Club career
Uprichard played in goal for Glenavon and later for Distillery before signing for Arsenal in 1948 for £1,500. He never played an Arsenal first-team game, with Ted Platt and George Swindin being higher in the pecking order. He was transferred to Swindon Town in November 1949, later becoming the first choice goalkeeper.

The 1952–53 season was his last at Swindon before his transfer to Portsmouth in November 1952.

Uprichard was Eddie Lever's first signing as Pompey manager. He was later followed by Derek Dougan from Distillery. Uprichard played nearly 200 first-team games for Portsmouth in seven seasons. He later played for Southend United, Hastings United and Ramsgate Athletic.

International career

Uprichard was awarded 18 senior international caps for Northern Ireland, the first coming against Scotland in 1951. He played in the 1958 World Cup Finals in Sweden alongside Billy Bingham, Jimmy McIlroy and Danny Blanchflower. Despite sustaining a broken hand and an ankle injury, he kept the Czechoslovakia attack at bay in a play-off win which secured Northern Ireland a quarter-final berth.

His final game for Northern Ireland was, like his first, against Scotland, in November 1958.
Norman died on Monday 31 January 2011 after a long illness.

Footnotes

References
 The Irish News, 2 February 2004]
Northern Ireland's Footballing Greats

1928 births
2011 deaths
People from Lurgan
Association football goalkeepers
Association footballers from Northern Ireland
Northern Ireland international footballers
1958 FIFA World Cup players
Glenavon F.C. players
Lisburn Distillery F.C. players
Arsenal F.C. players
Portsmouth F.C. players
Swindon Town F.C. players
Southend United F.C. players
Ramsgate F.C. players
Hastings United F.C. (1948) players